Conus ignotus is a species of sea snail, a marine gastropod mollusk in the family Conidae, the cone snails and their allies.

Like all species within the genus Conus, these snails are predatory and venomous. They are capable of "stinging" humans, therefore live ones should be handled carefully or not at all.

Distribution
This species occurs in the Caribbean Sea off Nicaragua to Colombia.

Description 
The size of the shell varies between 15 mm and 25 mm.

References

Cargile, W. P. 1998. Description of Conus ignotus, a new species from Nicaragua. Siratus 2(14):9–14
  Puillandre N., Duda T.F., Meyer C., Olivera B.M. & Bouchet P. (2015). One, four or 100 genera? A new classification of the cone snails. Journal of Molluscan Studies. 81: 1–23

External links
 

ignotus
Gastropods described in 1998
Fauna of the Caribbean